Patrick Mylott, VC (June 1820 – 22 December 1878) was an Irish soldier and a recipient of the Victoria Cross, the highest award for gallantry in the face of the enemy that can be awarded to British and Commonwealth forces.

Military career
Mylott was born in  Hollymount, Claremorris, County Mayo. He was approximately 37 years old, and a private in the 84th Regiment of Foot (later the 2nd Battalion, York and Lancaster Regiment), British Army during the Indian Mutiny when the following deeds took place for which he was awarded the Victoria Cross:

Mylott later achieved the rank of sergeant. He died in Liverpool, Lancashire on 22 December 1878.

References

External links
Location of grave and VC medal (Liverpool)

1820 births
1878 deaths
19th-century Irish people
British Army recipients of the Victoria Cross
Indian Rebellion of 1857 recipients of the Victoria Cross
Irish recipients of the Victoria Cross
Irish soldiers in the British Army
Military personnel from County Mayo 
York and Lancaster Regiment soldiers
Burials at Anfield Cemetery